Iler is an unincorporated community in Seneca County, in the U.S. state of Ohio.

History
Iler had its start in 1885 when the Nickel Plate Railroad was extended to that point. A post office was established at Iler in 1885, and remained in operation until 1923.

References

Unincorporated communities in Seneca County, Ohio
Populated places established in 1885
1885 establishments in Ohio
Unincorporated communities in Ohio